The Royal Scot Locomotive and General Trust (RSL&GT) is a charitable trust set up in 2009, to enable ownership and restoration to mainline running condition of the London Midland and Scottish Railway Royal Scot Class locomotive No. 6100 Royal Scot.

The trust has since been expanded and now owns a number of mainline locomotives in various states of repair, most of which are associated with the Trust's founder, Jeremy Hosking.  Furthermore, a group of companies including Locomotive Services (LSL) has been set up to encompass repair, maintenance of operation for RSL&GT and other assets.

History
The RSL&GT Ltd was formed in 2009 to protect for the long term, steam locomotives capable of hauling passenger trains on both the main line and heritage railways. Set up to acquire locomotive No. 6100 Royal Scot, the Trust became a registered charity in late 2011 when it acquired Great Western Railway 4-6-0 GWR 6000 Class No. 6024 King Edward I.

The Trust's stated intent is to have representative locomotives from the following railway companies:
London Midland and Scottish Railway
Great Western Railway
Southern Railway
London and North Eastern Railway
British Railways

RSL&GT locomotives are maintained to mainline operating standards and are operated on the mainline railways of the UK, in addition to preserved railways by Locomotive Services.

Fleet

The fleet is operated by Locomotive Services.

References

External links
RSL&GT website
Icons Of Steam Website - Locomotive Services trading website with links to associated companies and trusts

Heritage railways in the United Kingdom
Clubs and societies in London
Transport charities based in the United Kingdom